Rapala ribbei is a butterfly in the family Lycaenidae. It was described by Julius Röber in 1886. It is endemic to Sulawesi. The name honours Carl Ribbe.

References

External links
"Rapala Moore, [1881]" at Markku Savela's Lepidoptera and Some Other Life Forms'' 

Rapala (butterfly)
Butterflies described in 1886